Herberts Kušķis (5 March 1913 – 29 December 1994) was a Latvian ice hockey goaltender. He played for Unions Rīga and HK ASK Rīga during his career. He won the Latvian league championship six times, twice with Unions (1932 and 1933) and four with ASK (1935, 1936, 1938, 1939). Kušķis also played for the Latvian national team at the 1936 Winter Olympics and four World Championships.

References

External links
 

1913 births
1994 deaths
Ice hockey people from Riga
People from Kreis Riga
Latvian ice hockey goaltenders
Olympic ice hockey players of Latvia
Ice hockey players at the 1936 Winter Olympics
Latvian World War II refugees
Latvian emigrants to Canada